Oskar Moll (21 July 1875, Brieg – 19 August 1947, Berlin) was a German Fauvist painter; best known for his landscapes, portraits and somewhat abstract still-lifes.

Biography 
Moll initially studied biology in Switzerland, but also taught himself how to paint and decided to pursue art as a career instead. After some time in Munich, he went to Berlin, where he became an assistant in the studios of Lovis Corinth. In 1906, he married the sculptor and painter, Margarethe Haeffner. The following year, they went to Paris, where he made the acquaintance of Henri Matisse and became an habitué of Le Dôme Café. As a result he, Margarethe and their friend Hans Purrmann participated in creating the short-lived Académie Matisse. During the war, he lived in Berlin and was among the first members of the November Group. He was also a member of the Free Secession.

He succeeded August Endell as its Director in 1925 and served until its closure in 1932, following the emergency decrees issued by Heinrich Brüning. He then transferred to the Kunstakademie Düsseldorf, but was there for only a year when he was defamed and dismissed for being a purveyor of "degenerate art". A planned exhibition of his works was closed by the Nazi government in 1935. Two years later, thirty-five of his works were confiscated and displayed at the propagandistic Degenerate Art Exhibition in Munich.

In 1936, he and Margarethe had settled into a reclusive life in Berlin, but their home and studio, along with numerous paintings, some by Matisse and Picasso, were destroyed during an air raid in 1943. They attempted to find refuge in his hometown, but were forced to return to Berlin in 1945 when the Red Army occupied that area. He died in Berlin in 1947

Recently, the  has begun a research project devoted to his works.

Selected paintings

References

Further reading 
 Gerhard Leistner: Oskar Moll als Impulsgeber für die Moderne an der Breslauer Akademie. In: Dagmar Schmengler u. a. (Hrsg.): Maler. Mentor. Magier. Otto Mueller und sein Netzwerk in Breslau. Kehrer, Heidelberg u. a. 2018, S. 178–187.
 
 Ernst Scheyer: Die Kunstakademie Breslau und Oskar Moll. Holzner, Würzburg 1961.

External links 

 
 Oskar Moll Projekt, Homepage
 Oskar Moll, Homepage of the website by his daughter, Brigitte Würtz
 More works by Moll @ ArtNet

1875 births
1947 deaths
19th-century German painters
19th-century German male artists
German Expressionist painters
German still life painters
People from Brzeg
Academic staff of Kunstakademie Düsseldorf
20th-century German painters
20th-century German male artists